David Gray (born 9 February 1979) is an English former professional snooker player from London.

Gray turned professional in 1996 after becoming the youngest ever winner of the prestigious English Amateur Championship. He went on to win the 2003 Scottish Open, break into the top 16 in the world rankings and reach the final of the 2004 UK Championship (where he made his first of two competitive maximums) - despite these successes early in his career, his form declined until he eventually dropped off the tour in 2010 aged just 31.

Career
Gray turned professional in 1996, after becoming the youngest winner of the English amateur title in 1995. Gray first qualified for the World Championship aged 19 in 1998 where he narrowly lost in round one to future World Champion John Higgins, who went on to win the tournament that year. He first demonstrated his potential by beating future seven-time World Champion Ronnie O'Sullivan 10–9 in the first round of the 2000 World Championship, a match in which O'Sullivan scored five . However, he was unable to repeat this success in the second round and lost 1–13 to Dominic Dale, scoring just 208 points, a record low for a best-of-25 match.

After winning the non-ranking 1998 Benson & Hedges Championship and following his World Championship performance in 2000, Gray was a consistent tournament quarter-finalist over the next eighteen months, but did not reach his first ranking final until the 2002 Scottish Open. In this tournament, Gray eliminated defending champion Peter Ebdon 6–3 in the semi-finals, having already taken out Stephen Hendry and John Higgins. Stephen Lee eventually defeated Gray in the final, 9–2. However, in the same tournament a year later, Gray again eliminated Higgins and Hendry en route to the final, and this time won the event, defeating newcomer (and another eventual world champion) Mark Selby 9–7.

Although Gray was unable to qualify for the 2003 World Championship, his success at the 2003 Scottish Open (his only ranking tournament win) saw him break into the top 16 in the 2003/2004 world rankings, where he remained through 2005/2006. In the 2004 World Championship, he advanced to the quarter-finals, losing 13–9 to Graeme Dott. This performance helped him to no. 12 in the 2004/2005 world rankings (to date, his best-ever position).

On 28 November 2004 he reached his third – and to date, latest – ranking final in the UK Championship. He lost 10–1 to Stephen Maguire in the final. It was during this tournament that Gray scored his first maximum break – the 50th ever made in professional play – in the fifth frame of his last-32 match against Mark Selby (whom he had defeated in the 2003 Scottish Open final). His semi-final against Joe Perry was particularly memorable as Perry appeared to have won the match 9-7 by potting a colour leaving Gray requiring a snooker, but Perry himself was snookered on the next red, failed to hit it, and didn't score another point as Gray cleared the table then hit a 139 total clearance in the deciding frame.

Gray never advanced beyond the quarter-finals in a World Championship.

In the 2006 Grand Prix, he advanced from the group stage (in which the world's top 32 plus sixteen qualifiers are split into groups of six, who play each other round-robin with the two most successful players in each group progressing), before losing 2–5 to O'Sullivan in the last 16. He did not qualify for the 2007 World Championship, losing to 1991 winner John Parrott, and dropped out of the top 32 in the 2007/2008 rankings. A lack of success continued into the next season, with defeat to Liu Chuang in World Championship qualifying ensuring that he would be outside the top 40 of the rankings for the following year.

Gray fell off the circuit after the 2008–09 season but a World Snooker wildcard was awarded to him to allow him to remain on tour for the 2009–10 season.

After a disappointing 2009/2010 season he finished 77th for the 2010/2011 season and on 28 May 2011 Gray failed to qualify for the professional tour for the next season losing in the Q school qualifying stages.

After yet another poor performance in the Q school stages in May 2012 also saw him fail to qualify for the 2012/2013 professional tour.

The same was to follow in May 2013, as another poor performance in the Q School qualifying rounds led to disappointment, as he failed to qualify for the 2013/2014 tour. He did however enter himself into the first tournament of the season; the Bulgaria Open and was drawn against Gerard Greene in the last 128, however he withdrew from the tournament before it started and has not played another match since.

Personal life
On 7 October 2009, whilst on holiday in Thailand, Gray was found unconscious and rushed to hospital after blacking out. The 30-year-old was rescued by paramedics after being found collapsed and wearing only his underpants in a grove in the Thai holiday resort of Pattaya. He blacked out after drinking with friends and woke to find himself on a trolley in the Banglamung Hospital. 110sport Group chairman Lee Doyle said he will offer every assistance to help Gray.

Performance and rankings timeline

Career finals

Ranking finals: 3 (1 title)
{|
| valign=top width=40% align=left |

Non-ranking finals: 2 (2 titles)

Amateur finals: 5 (3 titles)

References

External links
 
 Profile on worldsnooker.com
 Profile on globalsnookercentre.co.uk
 Profile at Pro Snooker Blog

1979 births
Living people
Snooker players from London
People from the London Borough of Merton